Penrhyndeudraeth Football Club (also abbreviated Penrhyn) is a football team, playing in the North Wales Coast West Football League Premier Division. The club was re-formed in 1981 and plays their home fixtures at Maes Y Parc, Penrhyndeudraeth.

History 
Clwb Pêl-Droed Penrhyndeudraeth / Penrhyndeudraeth Football Club

Although football is believed to have been played in Penrhyndeudraeth as far back as the 1900s, and then by a team known as Penrhyndeudraeth Rovers in the 1910s, there are no real records for that period. Competitive football in Penrhyndeudraeth can, however, be traced back to the 1930s, with the team of the village's Cooke's Explosive Works team, Cooke's United FC, being involved in the Lleyn & District League during the 1937–38 and 1938–39 seasons, then in the Lleyn Peninsula League after the 2nd World War during the 1946–47 and 1947–48 seasons. For the 1948–49 season they joined the Welsh League (North) and were involved in that League until 1950–51. The team then joined the Cambrian Coast League for the 1951–52 season, and records show their involvement, with limited success, until the end of the 1957–58 season.

A new club, Penrhyndeudraeth United, was then formed and joined the Caernarfon & District League at the start of the 1966–67 season, but folded, after 3 unsuccessful seasons, at the end of the 1968–69 season.

Clwb Pêl-Droed Penrhyndeudraeth, in its current form, was formed in 1981, joining the Sain Caernarfon & District League. Matches were played on the Cae Sarn pitch, in the centre of the village, and despite various problems with the nature of the facilities, the club grew from strength to strength, winning the League Championship in the 1984–85 and 1985–86 seasons; Alves Cup in 1984–85; Will Evans Cup in 1985–86 and the Moorings Cup in 1984–85 and 1985–86. Promotion was gained to the Gwynedd League for the 1986–87 season, when the Club moved to its current Maes Y Parc ground. Honours achieved in the following seasons were the Wyn Burrows (Most Sporting Team) Trophy at the end of the 1991–92, 1995–96 and 1996–97 seasons; the Heritage Homes Eryri Shield in 1995–96, President's Cup runners-up 1996–97, but winners of that Cup in 1997–98, as well as Gwynedd League runners-up at the end of the 1998–99 season. Despite an opportunity of promotion to the Welsh Alliance League at that time, the team disbanded and the 1999–2000 season saw the Club go an entire season without winning a single League match, and relegation followed to the Caernarfon & District League.

The Club saw many managerial and squad changes, with little or no success, until the 2009–10 season, when the team were finalists in the League's Gwynedd Safeflue Cup and their League position led to promotion from Caernarfon & District Division 2 to Division 1. The team were then runners-up in Division 1 and winners of the Kon-X Wales Cup and Moorings Cup in 2010–11 under the management of Gareth Piercy and Richard Davies. During the next pre-season, Gareth Piercy resigned as manager, with Richard Davies taking over and added Bleddyn Williams as his assistant. Promotion was eventually and belatedly gained to the Gwynedd League and the team achieved a League treble, League Championship and winners of both the Gwynedd Safeflue Shield and Bob Owen Memorial Shield. The 2012–13 season, the club's first ever at Welsh Alliance League level, was again a success – finishing 3rd in the League, winning the Take Stock Van Hire Cup (for 2nd Division Clubs), runners-up in the Mawddach Challenge Cup and also the trophy for the best official programme in the League's 2nd Division. The 2013–14 season saw the Club being champions of the Welsh Alliance 2nd Division, finalists in the Take Stock Van Hire Cup and semi-finalists in the FAW Trophy, also winning the trophy for the best official programme in the League's 2nd Division, for the second season in succession. 2014–15 saw the team finish 5th in the Welsh Alliance 1st Division, as well as reaching the final of the FAW Trophy, which was the most prestigious day ever in the club's history. Last season, the team finished 6th in the Welsh Alliance 1st Division and added a new trophy to the honours list by winning the Mawddach Challenge Cup, another memorable day in the club's relatively short history. 2016–17 saw another 6th-place finish and another cup final, eventually losing out to Glantraeth in the closing minutes of extra time in the Cookson Cup Final. This season the club will again compete at its highest level in Welsh football and seek to establish itself at this level.

League standings in recent years 

* Current league position as of 27 April 2019

Results Grid - 2018–19 season

Honours 
Cynghrair Caernarfon a’r Cylch / Caernarfon & District League
Champions: 1984–85, 1985–86
Runners-up: 2010–11
Cwpan Alves / Alves Cup
Winners: 1984–85
Cwpan Will Evans / Will Evans Cup
Winners: 1985–86
Finalists: 1984–85, 1986–87
Cwpan Moorings / Moorings Cup
Winners: 1984–85, 1985–86, 2010–11
Finalists: 1986–87

* Promoted to Gwynedd League 1987 *

Tlws Cynghrair Gwynedd League ‘Most Sporting Club’ Wyn Burrows Trophy
Winners: 1991–92, 1995–96, 1996–97
Cwpan Meirionydd / Meirionydd Cup
Winners: 1994
Tarian Heritage Homes (Wales) Ltd. Eryri Shield
Winners: 1995–96
Cwpan y Llywydd Cynghrair Gwynedd League Presidents Cup
Finalists: 1996–97
Winners: 1997–98
Cynghrair Pêl-Droed Hyfforddiant Gwynedd Training Football League
Runners-up: 1998–99
Cwpan Safeflue Caernarfon a'r Cylch / Caernarfon & District Safeflue Cup
Finalists: 2009–10

* Promoted to Caernarfon & District League Division 1 *

Cwpan Kon-X Cymru / Kon-X Wales Cup
Winners: 2010–11     

*  Promoted to Gwynedd League 2011 *

Cynghrair Pêl-Droed Gwynedd Football League
Champions: 2011–12
Tarian Gwynedd Safeflue Shield
Winners: 2011–12     
Tarian Goffa Bob Owen Memorial Shield
Winners: 2011–12

* Promoted to Lock Stock Welsh Alliance League Division 2 *

Cwpan Take Stock Van Hire Cup
Winners: 2012–13
Finalists: 2013–14
Cwpan Her Mawddach / Mawddach Challenge Cup     
Finalists: 2012–13
Winners: 2015–16
Rhaglen Y Flwyddyn / Programme of the Year
Winners: 2012–13, 2013–14
Cynghrair Pêl-Droed Undebol Lock Stock y Gogledd / Lock Stock Welsh Alliance Football League
Champions: 2013–14 (Adran 2 / Division 2)

* Promoted to Lock Stock Welsh Alliance League Division 1 *

Tlws CBDC / FAW Trophy
Finalists: 2014–15
Cwpan Cookson Lock Stock / Lock Stock Cookson Cup
Finalists: 2016–17, 2018–19

Current squad

Management

Club Officials

Junior Teams 
All play in the Llyn and Eifionydd Junior Football League

References

External links 
 Official website
 Official Twitter account

Football clubs in Wales
Welsh Alliance League clubs
Sport in Gwynedd
Penrhyndeudraeth
Gwynedd League clubs
North Wales Coast Football League clubs
Caernarfon & District League clubs